Mike McGuire (born March 18, 1977) is the head coach of the Radford University women's basketball team.

In six years as a high school basketball coach, he accumulated a record of 105-52. At Hidden Valley High School, McGuire led the team to back to back Virginia Group AA state titles. Over those two years, at Hidden Valley High School, he accumulated a record of 55-5.

Head coaching record

References 

1979 births
Living people
High school basketball coaches in the United States
Radford Highlanders women's basketball coaches
Richmond Spiders women's basketball coaches
Roanoke College alumni
American women's basketball coaches
People from Vinton, Virginia
21st-century American women